Stuart Stokes (born 5 October 1976) is a British track and field athlete competing in the 3000 metres steeplechase and full-time teacher. He competed in the steeplechase at the 2012 Summer Olympics where he finished 35th.

Competition record

References

1976 births
Living people
Sportspeople from Bolton
British male steeplechase runners
English male steeplechase runners
Olympic athletes of Great Britain
Athletes (track and field) at the 2012 Summer Olympics
Commonwealth Games competitors for England
Athletes (track and field) at the 2002 Commonwealth Games
Athletes (track and field) at the 2006 Commonwealth Games
Athletes (track and field) at the 2010 Commonwealth Games